The Central Ural Publishing House, formerly the Sverdlovsk Publishing House was a Soviet and Russian book publisher head-quartered in Yekaterinburg. It was established in 1920. In 1930–1940 it was the largest book publisher in the Ural region.

History 
The company was established in 1920. It was initially called Uralgosizdat (lit. "The Ural department of the State publisher"). It published propaganda brochures, posters, leaflets, the first alphabet book for adults in the Soviet Union. In 1922 it was transformed into the joint-stock company Uralkniga (Уралкнига). Bella Kun became the chairman of the board. In 1934 it was renamed to the Sverdlovsk Publishing House, abbreviated as Sverdlgiz.

In 1963 it was rebranded as the Central Ural Publishing House, with the State Committee for Publishing taking over. The Tyumen department was opened. It was active till late-1990s. The number of published titles gradually decreased through the years, e.g. 104 books were released in 1979, but only 26 in 1997.

Publications 

 Boyevye Rebyata (children's almanac)
 Uralsky Sovremennik
 Uralsky Sledopyt (magazine)

References

External links
  The official information about Central Ural Publishing House

Publishing companies of the Soviet Union
Publishing companies established in 1920
Defunct book publishing companies
Publishing companies disestablished in the 1990s
Book publishing companies of Russia
Companies based in Yekaterinburg
Defunct companies of Russia